, is a public corporation that provides financial services in Japan and internationally. Its headquarters are located in Tokyo, Japan.

Overview 
JFC is a policy based financial institution whose co-function is the provision of business loans to SMEs and business start-ups; and educational loans to individuals for school entrance fees and related expenses. All these are with the aim of complement financial activities carried out by privately owned financial institutions as well as improve the living standards of the Japanese people.

The company has 152 branch offices in Japan, 2 representative offices overseas, and a workforce of 7,364 employees.

History 
Japan Finance Corporation was founded on 1 October 2008 with the passing of the Japan Finance Corporation Act. This Act led to the merger of four policy-based financing institutions i.e.: 
 The National Life Finance Corporation (NLFC) 
 The Agriculture, Forestry and Fisheries Finance Corporation (AFC) 
 The Japan Finance Corporation for Small and Medium Enterprise (JASME) and 
 The International Financial Operations of the Japan Bank for International Cooperation (JBIC). 
In April 2012, the Japan Bank for International Cooperation Act was passed. This led to the separation of the Japan Bank for International Cooperation (JBIC) from JFC. JBIC has since operated as an independent entity.

Operations 
JFC has divided its operations in three units:

Micro Business and Individual Unit 
This unit acts (Micro Unit) as a community based financial institution and provides loans to small businesses, business start-ups and educational loans to individuals. The  the Micro Unit had made loans to 0.95 million businesses. It is estimated that 77,000 jobs were created and 110,000 educational loans are issued annually as a result of the Micro Unit.

Agriculture, Forestry, Fisheries and Food Business Unit 
This unit (AFFF Unit) contributes to the development of domestic agriculture, forestry, the fishery industry and improved quality of food. This is by providing access to finance for individuals and businesses operating in these industries.

Small and Medium Enterprise Unit 
Recognizing that SMEs play a key economic role in the Japanese economy, this unit assists in the development and growth of SMEs through the provision of financial support in the form of loans and credit insurance.

Ownership 
JFC is wholly owned by the Japanese government.

Governance 
JFC is governed by a five-person board of directors with Koichi Hosokawa as the Governor and Chief Executive.

References 

Financial services companies of Japan
Japanese companies established in 2008
Financial services companies established in 2008
Government-owned companies of Japan